Phoebe Foster (born Angeline Egar; July 9, 1896 – June 1975) was an American theater and film actress.

Career

Foster studied at the American Academy of Dramatic Arts. She began appearing on Broadway in 1914, starting with a production of Roi Cooper Megrue's Under Cover. Her subsequent Broadway appearances included The Cinderella Man (1916), Three's a Crowd (1919), Captain Applejack (1921), The Jazz Singer (1925), and Topaze (1930).

After appearing in a couple of short films, in 1931 she made her feature film debut in George Cukor's Tarnished Lady alongside Tallulah Bankhead. That same year she also appeared in Edmund Goulding's The Night Angel with Nancy Carroll and Fredric March. In 1933, she was in the comedies Our Betters and Dinner at Eight, both directed by Cukor. Two years later she appeared in the Tolstoy adaptation Anna Karenina with Greta Garbo. In 1935 she also returned to Broadway for the brief run of Living Dangerously. In 1936 she had her first stage appearance in London, starring in a production of Night of January 16th. Foster's last movie was The Gorgeous Hussy in 1936. Her final Broadway production was American Landscape (1938).

Personal life
Foster was born in 1896 as Angeline Egar (possibly Eager) in Center Harbor, New Hampshire. She was the daughter of Arthur and Emily Egar.

Foster married millionaire Harold LeRoy Whitney, heir to an ironworks fortune, on September 12, 1927. Whitney had divorced his previous wife just days before. The couple kept the marriage secret for several days before the press discovered it. They filed for divorce in 1943. Phoebe Foster died in 1975 in Boston, Massachusetts.

Credits

Broadway

1914: Under Cover
1915: Under Fire
1915: Back Home
1916: The Cinderella Man
1917: The Lassoo
1917: The Gipsy Trail
1918: By Pigeon Post
1919: First is Last
1919: Three's a Crowd
1921: Toto
1921: Captain Applejack
1924: Garden of Weeds
1924: High Stakes
1925: The Jazz Singer
1926: The Donovan Affair
1927: Interference
1929: Scotland Yard
1929: The Amorous Antic
1930: Topaze
1930: That's the Woman
1930: The Truth Game
1931: Cynara
1935: Living Dangerously
1938: Bachelor Born
1938: American Landscape

Film
1919: An Honorable Cad (Short)
1930: Grounds for Murder (Short)
1931: Tarnished Lady as Germaine Prentiss
1931: The Night Angel as Theresa Masar
1933: Our Betters as Princess
1933: Scarlet River as Phoebe Foster (uncredited)
1933: Dinner at Eight as Miss Alden
1935: Anna Karenina as Dolly
1935: O'Shaughnessy's Boy as Girl on Camel in Parade (uncredited)
1936: The White Angel as Mrs. Elizabeth Herbert
1936: The Gorgeous Hussy as Emily Donaldson (uncredited) (final film role)

Notes

References

External links

 
 

1896 births
1975 deaths
20th-century American actresses
Actresses from New Hampshire
American film actresses
American stage actresses
People from Center Harbor, New Hampshire